, also known as , is a lost 1934 independently made Japanese black-and-white kaiju film directed by Yoshiro Edamasa.

Plot 
The Great Buddha of Shugakuen in Ueno Village, Aichi Prefecture (currently Tokai City) opens its eyes and tours Nagoya City. Inuyama Castle Buddha was sleeping a wink on the side of the shrine Masumida after the pilgrimage, and Nagoya Public Hall to return to again Nagoya city, Nagoya City Council, Matsuzakaya, Kakuozan, Tsurumai Park, Auditorium Nagoya Tour of the like, Chiryu of Mikawa Yatsuhashi and Tsunefuku Face the Great Buddha of the temple. After journeying through Hell, the Great Buddha rides in the clouds and heads for Tokyo.

Cast 

 Hidemichi Ishikawa
 Tankai Soganoya
 Kazuyo Kojima

Remake 

In 2018, 3Y Film produced a film directed by Yoshiro Edamasa's grandson Hiroto Yokokawa with a budget of ¥1,481 million.

References

External links 

 

1934 films
1934 lost films
Japanese black-and-white films
Lost Japanese films
Giant monster films
Kaiju films
Tokusatsu films